Trevor Garrett (born 31 May 1993) is a retired New Zealand cricketer. He made his first-class debut for Canterbury in the 2017–18 Plunket Shield season on 9 March 2018. This has been his only first-class match so far.

References

External links
 

1993 births
Living people
New Zealand cricketers
Place of birth missing (living people)
Canterbury cricketers